Jamie Simone is an American voice director and producer, best known for directing Naruto, Sailor Moon and Tiger & Bunny. He is the owner of the recording studio Studiopolis. In 2012, he was nominated for a Daytime Emmy Award for "Outstanding Directing in an Animated Program" for Transformers: Prime, which he took over from Susan Blu.

Filmography

Anime
 Naruto – Akamaru
 Naruto: Shippuden – Akamaru

Film
 Bleach: Hell Verse – Garogai
 Dino Time – Additional Voices
 Naruto the Movie: Ninja Clash in the Land of Snow – Additional Voices
 Naruto Shippuden the Movie: The Will of Fire – Izumo Kamizuki
 Sky Blue – Dispatcher

Video games
 Naruto: Clash of Ninja 2 – Akamaru
 Naruto: Path of a Ninja 2 – Akamaru
 Naruto: Ultimate Ninja – Waraji
 Naruto: Uzumaki Chronicles – Akamaru

Voice director

 24: The Game
 Afro Samurai
 Afro Samurai: Resurrection
 Avengers Confidential: Black Widow & Punisher
 The Avengers: Earth's Mightiest Heroes
 Brave: The Search for Spirit Dancer
 Bratz: Starrin' and Stylin'
 Casper: A Spirited Beginning
 Creepy Crawlers
 DC Nation Shorts
 Digimon Data Squad
 Doctor Strange: The Sorcerer Supreme
 Gormiti: The Lords of Nature Return!
 Happiness Is a Warm Blanket, Charlie Brown
 Hulk and the Agents of S.M.A.S.H.
 Hulk Versus
 Initial D
 The Invincible Iron Man
 Kangaroo Jack: G'Day U.S.A.!
 Kaze no Yojimbo
 Lego Marvel Super Heroes
 Loonatics Unleashed
 Marvel Future Avengers
 Marvel Heroes
 Marvel Super Hero Squad
 My Little Pony: The Movie
 Naruto
 Naruto: Shippuden
 Next Avengers: Heroes of Tomorrow
 NFL Rush Zone: Season of the Guardians
 Planet Hulk
 Resonance of Fate
 Saban's Adventures of Oliver Twist
 Sailor Moon
 The Secret Files of the Spy Dogs
 Sonic Free Riders
 Space Chimps 2: Zartog Strikes Back
 Spider-Man Unlimited
 Spider-Man Unlimited (video game)
 Stitch!
 The Orbital Children
 The Super Hero Squad Show 
 The Tale of Princess Kaguya
 Tenkai Knights
 Tenko and the Guardians of the Magic
 Thor: Tales of Asgard
 Tiger & Bunny
 Totally Spies! - (seasons 1-2)
 Transformers: Prime
 Transformers: Robots in Disguise
 Ultimate Avengers
 Ultimate Avengers 2: Rise of the Panther
 Walter Melon
 When Marnie Was There
 The Why Why Family
 Wolverine and the X-Men
 Z-Squad

References

External links
 
 

1961 births
Living people
American male voice actors
American casting directors
American voice directors
Place of birth missing (living people)